Gaob Dr. Justus ǀUruhe ǁGaroëb (born 16 December 1942) is the Gaob (King) of the ǂNūkhoe ǁAes (Damara Nation) as of 1977 [year of customary designation] and is the longest serving supreme traditional leader in recorded history. Historical accounts (both oral and academic) have it that most gaogu (kings) reigned for 25 years (average), whilst the nation celebrated the Sapphire Anniversary of the ǁGaroëb dynasty. He (just like most if not all pre-independence traditional leaders was active in national politics and was at the forefront of the Namibian struggle for Indendence. Gaob Dr. ǁGaroëb was a staunch opponent of South African rule and led the oppositional Namibia National Front in the late 1970s and founded the United Democratic Front (UDF) in 1989.

ǁGaroëb was born in ǃGuidiǁgams [literally Fountain of the Reed Dancers] alias Omaruru, Erongo Region. He went to school at the Augustineum Training College in Okahandja and then started to study medicine at the University College of Zululand in South Africa. He did not finish his studies due to family obligations and lack of financial support.

ǁGaroëb became a member of the Damara Advisory Council in 1971, and its chairman in 1977, succeeding Chief David ǁGoreseb. When between 1975 and 1977 the Turnhalle Constitutional Conference was held in Windhoek with the aim of developing a constitution for a self-governed Namibia under South African control, ǁGaroëb "refused to take part". Instead he oversaw the Damara Council to merge into the Namibia National Front (NNF), one of the groups opposing the Turnhalle Conference and its results, in 1977. He also became the first president of the NNF.

In 1982, he became the Paramount Chief and Acting King of the Damara, and he has been King of the Damara since 1994. In 1989 
ǁGaroëb founded the United Democratic Front (UDF). He has been the President of the UDF since that time. Immediately prior to independence, he was a UDF member of the Constituent Assembly, which was in place from November 1989 to March 1990, and he has been a member of the National Assembly since 1990.

He has stood for the presidency on three occasions. In 1999, he placed fourth with 3.02% of the vote, in 2004 he placed fifth with 3.83% of the vote, and in 2009 he placed 5th with 2.37%. In Kunene Region, he received 22.5% of the vote, including winning the most the votes in Khorixas Constituency and Sesfontein Constituency.

References

1942 births
Living people
People from Omaruru
Damara people
Namibian chiefs
United Democratic Front (Namibia) politicians
Members of the National Assembly (Namibia)
Augustineum Secondary School alumni
Candidates for President of Namibia